2012 UEFA European Under-19 Championship (Elite Round) was the second round of qualifications for the final tournament of 2012 UEFA European Under-19 Championship.
The 25 teams that advanced from the qualifying round plus three teams who received byes to the elite round were distributed into seven groups of four teams each, with each group played in a round-robin format, with one of the four teams hosting all six group matches. The seven group-winning teams qualified automatically for the final tournament in Estonia.

Seeds
The draw for the elite round was held on 29 November 2011 in Nyon, with matches scheduled between 23 and 31 May 2012. A total of 28 participating teams were divided in four draw pots based on the coefficient ranking list established by taking into account only the results of the qualifying round. England, France and Spain received byes to the elite round and were seeded in the first pot.

The hosts of the seven one-venue mini-tournament groups are indicated below in italics.

Tiebreakers
If two or more teams are equal on points on completion of the group matches, the following criteria are applied to determine the rankings.
 Higher number of points obtained in the group matches played among the teams in question
 Superior goal difference from the group matches played among the teams in question
 Higher number of goals scored in the group matches played among the teams in question
 If, after applying criteria 1) to 3) to several teams, two teams still have an equal ranking, the criteria 1) to 3) will be reapplied to determine the ranking of these teams. If this procedure does not lead to a decision, criteria 5) and 6) will apply
 Results of all group matches:
 Superior goal difference
 Higher number of goals scored
 Drawing of lots
Additionally, if two teams which have the same number of points and the same number of goals scored and conceded play their last group match against each other and are still equal at the end of that match, their final rankings are determined by the penalty shoot-out and not by the criteria listed above. This procedure is applicable only if a ranking of the teams is required to determine the group winner.

Group 1

Group 2

Group 3

Group 4

Group 5

Group 6

Group 7

Qualified nations

1 Only counted appearances for under-19 era (bold indicates champion for that year, while italic indicates hosts)

References

External links
UEFA.com

Qualification
UEFA European Under-19 Championship qualification,,